Chadongcha Sports Club is a North Korean football club based in Pyongyang, North Korea playing in the DPR Korea League. The club is affiliated with the North Korean .

Achievements

References

Football clubs in North Korea
Works association football clubs in North Korea